The Object 120 SU-152 "Taran" was a fully enclosed Soviet tank destroyer built in 1965, that never progressed past the experimental stage.

History
In the early 1960s, the Soviet military concluded that the armor-piercing ammunition used by the T-55 medium tank, and the T-10 heavy tank was unable to penetrate the frontal armor of the newest American M60 and British Chieftain main battle tanks. The Soviets therefore began parallel research on several different anti-tank weapon systems, such as development of new armour-piercing discarding sabot and shaped charge ammunition for existing tank guns, new rifled and smoothbore tank guns with calibers ranging from 115 mm to 130 mm with anti-tank missiles.

One of these projects became the SU-152 "Taran". The factory designation was Object 120 (Объект 120). In terms of firepower and mobility, it surpassed all foreign tank destroyers. The main reason the SU-152 "Taran" wasn't adopted was due to the development and adoption of more effective 125 mm smoothbore tank gun and anti-tank missiles.

Armament
The SU-152 "Taran" was armed with the 152.4 mm M-69 "Taran" rifled gun, with a barrel length of 9045 mm, fitted with a powerful muzzle brake. With an overall length of about 10 meters it is the longest gun of any type ever installed in a fully enclosed armoured fighting vehicle. The gun had a maximum direct fire range of 2050 meters. The SU-152 "Taran" carried 22 rounds of APDS and high-explosive ammunition. The gun had a semi-automatic breech block, with a rate of fire of 3–5 rounds/min. The high-explosive ammunition had a 43.5 kg shell and a maximum charge of 10.7 kg. Firing the 12.5 kg APDS shell with a maximum charge (10.7 kg), which gave it a muzzle velocity of 1720 m/s, the M-69 "Taran" had an armor penetration of 290 mm of RHA at 90° at a range of 2000 meters.

See also
 FV 4005 Stage 2, a similar experimental British design for a tank destroyer, armed with a 183mm cannon

References

Самоходная артиллерийская установка СУ-152 "Объект 120"

Further reading
Г. Л. Холявский Самоходные артиллерийские установки, 1945–2000 // Энциклопедия бронетехники. — ООО "Харвест", 2001. — 656 с. — (Гусеничные боевые машины, 1919–2000 гг). 
М. В. Павлов, И. В. Павлов. Отечественные бронированные машины 1945—1965 гг. // Техника и вооружение: вчера, сегодня, завтра. — Москва: Техинформ, 2009. — № 8. — С. 56. 

Tank destroyers
Abandoned military projects of the Soviet Union